Shaburova is a rural locality (a village) in Yorgvinskoye Rural Settlement, Kudymkarsky District, Perm Krai, Russia. The population was 7 as of 2010.

Geography 
Shaburova is located 19 km northeast of Kudymkar (the district's administrative centre) by road. Derskanova is the nearest rural locality.

References 

Rural localities in Kudymkarsky District